USS Hercules (PHM-2) was a United States Navy hydrofoil patrol vessel operated from 1982 to 1993. Pegasus class vessels were designed for high speed and mobility and carried a powerful armament for their size. The Hercules was named for the constellation.

References

External links 
 

 

Pegasus-class hydrofoils
Patrol vessels of the United States Navy
Ships built in Renton, Washington
1982 ships